Blidworth is a civil parish in the Newark and Sherwood district of Nottinghamshire, England.  The parish contains nine listed buildings that are recorded in the National Heritage List for England.  Of these, one is at Grade II*, the middle of the three grades, and the others are at Grade II, the lowest grade.  The parish contains the village of Blidworth and the surrounding area.  The listed buildings consist of a church, headstones in the churchyard and its gateway, a house and associated features, a farmhouse, a former windmill, and a well head.


Key

Buildings

References

Citations

Sources

 

Lists of listed buildings in Nottinghamshire